The Madou Plaza Tower is a high-rise building in Brussels, Belgium. It was built in 1965, renovated between 2002 and 2006, and taken over by the European Commission. It is located on the Small Ring (Brussels' inner ring road), in the municipality of Saint-Josse-ten-Noode, at 1 /. It hosts the Commission's Directorate-General for Competition.

Architecture
The 33-story core of the Madou Tower was built in just over a month and has been compared as a smaller version of the MetLife Building in New York City. There is a high voltage transformer in the basement for power, along with a 1360 kW emergency generator added during renovation. Two lifts connect to the parking garage.

The renovation won the MIPIM Award 2006 in the 'Refurbished Office Buildings' category.

Commission
The European Commission bought the building on 13 March 2006 inaugurating it on 19 April when its 1500 employees moved in. Based in Madou, as of 2007, were the Directorates-General for Communication, Informatics, and Education and Culture and the Executive Agency for Competitiveness and Innovation. Staff were previously based on the Axa-building on square Schuman, which was to be demolished. Since late 2012 it has hosted the Directorate-General for Competition.

See also
 European commission
 Berlaymont building
 Charlemagne building
 Convent Van Maerlant
 Breydel building
 Brussels and the European Union
 Institutional seats of the European Union

References

External links

 Madou Plaza, Emporis
 News: European Commission moves to Madou Plaza, Emporis (2005-12-21)
 Tour Madou Plaza Nicolas Janberg's: Structure
 Madou Plaza, Glass Steel and Stone
 Official opening of Madou Plaza Tower, new EC building, European Commission (2006-04-20)
 Gallery: The Madou Tower, Office of the Obscure Passages – before and after images
 EUROPEAN COMMISSION : MADOU TOWER PHENOMENON BRINGS BRUSSELS FOLK CLOSER TO EUROPE.(Administrative Affairs, Audit and Anti-Fraud Unit inaugurates new building), Goliath (2006-04-20)

Buildings and structures in Brussels
Skyscraper office buildings in Belgium
Buildings and structures of the European Union
European quarter of Brussels
Saint-Josse-ten-Noode
Office buildings completed in 1965